Diegocanis is an extinct genus of cynodonts from the Late Triassic (Carnian) of Argentina. The type species, Diegocanis elegans, was named in 2013 from fossils found in the Cancha de Bochas Member of the Ischigualasto Formation in the Ischigualasto-Villa Unión Basin. Diegocanis was classified within a new family of probainognathian cynodonts called Ecteniniidae, along with the genera Ecteninion and Trucidocynodon.

References

Bibliography 
 

Prehistoric probainognathians
Prehistoric cynodont genera
Carnian genera
Late Triassic synapsids of South America
Triassic Argentina
Fossils of Argentina
Ischigualasto Formation
Fossil taxa described in 2013